Walter Luis Hime Pinheiro Soares (born 3 July 1959) is a Brazilian rower. He competed at the 1980 Summer Olympics and the 1984 Summer Olympics.

References

1959 births
Living people
Brazilian male rowers
Olympic rowers of Brazil
Rowers at the 1980 Summer Olympics
Rowers at the 1984 Summer Olympics
Place of birth missing (living people)
Pan American Games medalists in rowing
Pan American Games silver medalists for Brazil
Rowers at the 1983 Pan American Games
Medalists at the 1983 Pan American Games